Prince George's Community College (PGCC) is a public community college in Largo in Prince George's County, Maryland.  The college serves Prince George's County and surrounding areas, including Washington, D.C.

History

Founded in 1958, Prince George's Community College came into existence because there was perceived to be a need for educational opportunities for the residents of the county, particularly those who were still in the K–12 grades of the public schools in the late 1950s.

Classes commenced at Suitland High School, with a student body of 185; thus, the college celebrated 50 years of service in 2008. The college was the first educational institution to integrate in the county, and today serves more African-American students than any other post-secondary institution in the state of Maryland. In 1967, the college moved to its permanent location in Largo, Maryland, where it has grown to an enrollment of nearly 40,000 students. During the past decades, a handful of buildings on the campus has grown to 22 facilities.

In Spring 2007, the college selected its first female president, Dr. Charlene Dukes.

Academics
Prince George's Community College provides higher education to the local population. The college offers over 100 fields of study through its academic, workforce development, continuing education, and personal enrichment programs. More specifically,  PGCC has 68 academic degree programs and 34 professional certificate program, many of which feature distance learning options.  The college awards Associate of Arts, Associate of Science, and Associate of Arts in Teaching degrees.  In addition, PGCC allows students to transfer to a four-year college or university.

Accreditation
Prince George's Community College is accredited by the Middle States Commission on Higher Education. Its education, engineering, nursing, radiology, paramedic and respiratory therapy programs have specialized accreditation.

They also participate in dual-enrollment for high school junior and senior students from PGCPS. Students can take courses while still in high school, earning both high school and college credit.

Community focus 
The school hosts a number of special programs that address the needs and interests of county residents. These include the Book Bridge Project, the Center for Business and Industry Training and the Children's Developmental Clinic. College meeting rooms and recreational facilities are also available for use by the public. These facilities include the Robert I. Bickford Natatorium, which is open to individuals and groups. More than 1,000 events sponsored by community organizations are held at the college each year.

Campuses and training facilities

The main campus is located in Largo, Maryland, which opened in 1967.  PGCC operates extension centers at University Town Center in Hyattsville, and Andrews Air Force Base as well as Skilled Trades Center in Camp Springs.  The college shares an extension center with Howard Community College in Laurel called the Laurel College Center.

Within the last six years, the college has seen the completion of two new modern facilities: the Center for Advanced Technology and the Center for Health Studies. There are several more developments underway including a brand new Culinary Arts Center, renovation and expansion of Lanham Hall, the Queen Anne Arts Education Center, a renovation of the Rennie Forum auditorium, and a health and wellness center.

Student life

PGCC serves approximately 40,000 students.  The student body is 76% African American, 64% female, and has international students from 100 nations around the world.  The average age of Prince George's students is 47.

The college also offers many student services and resources like the study rooms, print services, and computer labs with tutoring. It also includes many places where students can hang out: the student lounge and indoor and outdoor gathering spaces.

Clubs and organizations
The college has 43 student clubs and organizations representing a wide variety of interest, including an Active Seniors Club, the African Student Union, a Caribbean Student Association,  an Honors Society, Intercollegiate Athletics, Improvisational Theatre, a Muslim Student Association, a chapter of Phi Theta Kappa, and a Student Governance Board to name a few.  The school mascot and also the name of the student newspaper is The Owl.

Student Governance Board
The Student Governance Board is the governing organization and official voice of the student body. The Student Governance Board make recommendations to the college's board of trustees and the college, obtains students' concerns and feedback, and collaborate with other student clubs and organizations in organizing academic seminars as well as student activities.

The business of the Student Governance Board is carried about by a Student Government Council, which consists of 15 members, including eight members of the Executive Office, six members of the college-Wide Forum, and the Student Trustees. The Student Government Council is elected annually during April of the Spring Semester. The 2009 Election has been considered the most successful election in the history of the Student Government Council. The Executive Office comprises the President, Vice President for Administrative Affairs, Vice President for Student Affairs, Vice President for Academic Affairs, Director of Public Relations, Director of Community Relations, Director of Club Relations, and Director of college-Wide Forum Relations. Any vacant positions are filled by presidential appointments with the consent of the Student Council.

Intercollegiate athletics

Prince George's Community College is a member of the National Junior College Athletic Association (NJCAA) and Maryland Junior College Athletic Conference (MD JUCO). Ten intercollegiate teams represent the college in the NJCAA and MD JUCO, including: 
 men's soccer
 women's soccer
 women's basketball
 men's basketball
 men's cross country
 women's cross country
 men's baseball
 women's softball
 men's track & field
 women's track & field
 cheerleading

Notable former students 

 Peter Bergman, actor
 Reginald Dwayne Betts, poet, teacher
 Frank Cho, cartoonist
 Fred Funk, professional golfer
 Ginuwine, singer-songwriter
 Karen Handel, 26th Secretary of State of Georgia
 Andrea Harrison, politician
 Cathy L. Lanier, Chief of the Metropolitan Police Department of the District of Columbia
 Jan C. Scruggs, Vietnam Veterans Memorial Fund founder
 Tulu, professional soccer player
 Troy Weaver, NBA executive

References

External links
 Official website

1958 establishments in Maryland
Community and junior colleges in Maryland
NJCAA athletics
Two-year colleges in the United States
Universities and colleges in Prince George's County, Maryland
Educational institutions established in 1958